Frederick Louis Cleaver (22 April 1885–1968) was an English footballer who played in the Football League for Derby County.

References

1885 births
1968 deaths
English footballers
Association football forwards
English Football League players
Derby County F.C. players
Preston North End F.C. players
Watford F.C. players
Redditch United F.C. players
Atherstone Town F.C. players